Henry Kendall Smith (1811–1854) was Mayor of the City of Buffalo, New York, serving 1850–1851.  He was born on April 2, 1811 in St. Croix, Virgin Islands. In 1819, he was sent to Baltimore, Maryland for education and then moved to New York City in 1828. Shortly thereafter he moved to Johnstown, New York to study law, opening a practice in 1832.  In 1833, he moved to Buffalo and began a legal partnership with Israel T. Hatch. He married Miss Voorhees of Johnstown in 1834; she died shortly thereafter and he remarried in June 1848, to Sally Ann Thompson, daughter of ex-Mayor Sheldon Thompson.  He was appointed District Attorney for Erie County in December 1836.  At the outbreak of the Patriot War he was made captain of one of the companies of citizen volunteers.  In 1848, he was appointed Postmaster of Buffalo.

On March 5, 1850, the local elections were held and Locofoco candidate Henry K. Smith was elected. During his term, he supported various civic improvements.  His term ended on March 11, 1851.  After leaving office, he continued his law partnership and died on September 23, 1854. He is buried in Forest Lawn Cemetery.

References

1811 births
1854 deaths
Mayors of Buffalo, New York
Burials at Forest Lawn Cemetery (Buffalo)
New York (state) Democrats
American people of United States Virgin Islands descent
19th-century American politicians
Erie County District Attorneys